

Events

Pre-1600
 978 – Franco-German war of 978–980: Holy Roman Emperor Otto II lifts the siege of Paris and withdraws.

1601–1900
1707 – Queen Anne's War: The second Siege of Pensacola comes to end with the failure of the British Empire and their Creek allies to capture Pensacola, Spanish Florida.
1718 – Great Northern War: King Charles XII of Sweden dies during a siege of the fortress of Fredriksten in Norway.
1782 – American Revolutionary War: Treaty of Paris: In Paris, representatives from the United States and Great Britain sign preliminary peace articles (later formalized as the 1783 Treaty of Paris).
1786 – The Grand Duchy of Tuscany, under Pietro Leopoldo I, becomes the first modern state to abolish the death penalty (later commemorated as Cities for Life Day).
1803 – The Balmis Expedition starts in Spain with the aim of vaccinating millions against smallpox in Spanish America and Philippines.
  1803   – In New Orleans, Spanish representatives officially transfer the Louisiana Territory to the French First Republic.
1853 – Crimean War: Battle of Sinop: The Imperial Russian Navy under Pavel Nakhimov destroys the Ottoman fleet under Osman Pasha at Sinop, a sea port in northern Turkey.
1864 – American Civil War: The Confederate Army of Tennessee suffers heavy losses in an attack on the Union Army of the Ohio in the Battle of Franklin.
1872 – The first-ever international football match takes place at Hamilton Crescent, Glasgow, between Scotland and England.

1901–present
1916 – Costa Rica signs the Buenos Aires Convention, a copyright treaty.
1936 – In London, the Crystal Palace is destroyed by fire.
1939 – World War II: The Soviet Red Army crosses the Finnish border in several places and bomb Helsinki and several other Finnish cities, starting the Winter War.
1940 – World War II: Signing of the Sino-Japanese Treaty of 1940 between the Empire of Japan and the newly formed Wang Jingwei-led Reorganized National Government of the Republic of China. This treaty was considered so unfair to China that it was compared to the Twenty-One Demands.
1941 – The Holocaust: The SS-Einsatzgruppen round up 11,000 Jews from the Riga Ghetto and kill them in the Rumbula massacre. 
1942 – World War II: Battle of Tassafaronga; A smaller squadron of Imperial Japanese Navy destroyers led by Raizō Tanaka defeats a U.S. Navy cruiser force under Carleton H. Wright.
1947 – Civil War in Mandatory Palestine begins, leading up to the creation of the State of Israel and the 1948 Arab–Israeli War.
1953 – Edward Mutesa II, the kabaka (king) of Buganda is deposed and exiled to London by Sir Andrew Cohen, Governor of Uganda.
1954 – In Sylacauga, Alabama, United States, the Hodges meteorite crashes through a roof and hits a woman taking an afternoon nap; this is the only documented case in the Western Hemisphere of a human being hit by a rock from space.
1962 – Eastern Air Lines Flight 512 crashes at Idlewild Airport, killing 25 people.
1966 – Decolonization: Barbados becomes independent from the United Kingdom.
1967 – Decolonization: South Yemen becomes independent from the United Kingdom.
  1967   – The Pakistan Peoples Party is founded by Zulfikar Ali Bhutto, who becomes its first chairman.
  1967   – Pro-Soviet communists in the Philippines establish Malayang Pagkakaisa ng Kabataan Pilipino as its new youth wing.
1971 – Iran seizes the Greater and Lesser Tunbs from the Emirates of Sharjah and Ras Al Khaimah.
1972 – Vietnam War: White House Press Secretary Ron Ziegler tells the press that there will be no more public announcements concerning American troop withdrawals from Vietnam because troop levels are now down to 27,000.
1981 – Cold War: In Geneva, representatives from the United States and the Soviet Union begin to negotiate intermediate-range nuclear weapon reductions in Europe. (The meetings end inconclusively on December 17.)
1995 – Official end of Operation Desert Storm.
  1995   – U.S. President Bill Clinton visits Northern Ireland and speaks in favor of the "Northern Ireland peace process" to a huge rally at Belfast City Hall; he calls IRA fighters "yesterday's men".
1999 – Exxon and Mobil sign a US$73.7 billion agreement to merge, thus creating ExxonMobil, the world's largest company.
  1999   – In Seattle, United States, demonstrations against a World Trade Organization meeting by anti-globalization protesters catch police unprepared and force the cancellation of opening ceremonies.
  1999   – British Aerospace and Marconi Electronic Systems merge to form BAE Systems, Europe's largest defense contractor and the fourth largest aerospace firm in the world.
2000 – NASA launches STS-97, the 101st Space Shuttle mission.
2004 – Lion Air Flight 538 overshoots the runway while landing at Adisumarmo International Airport and crashes, killing 25 people.
2005 – John Sentamu becomes the first black archbishop in the Church of England with his enthronement as the 97th Archbishop of York.
2012 – An Ilyushin Il-76 cargo plane belonging to Aéro-Service, crashes into houses near Maya-Maya Airport during a thunderstorm, killing at least 32 people.
2018 – A magnitude 7.1 earthquake with its epicenter only  from Anchorage, Alaska causes significant property damage but no deaths.
2021 – Barbados becomes a republic.
  2021   – A 15-year-old gunman murders four students and injures seven people, including a teacher, in a mass shooting at Oxford High School in Oxford Township, Michigan.

Births

Pre-1600
 539 – Gregory of Tours, French bishop and saint (probable; d. 594)
1310 – Frederick II, Margrave of Meissen (d. 1349)
1340 – John, Duke of Berry (d. 1416)
1364 – John FitzAlan, 2nd Baron Arundel, Scottish soldier (d. 1390)
1426 – Johann IV Roth, Roman Catholic bishop (d. 1506)
1427 – Casimir IV Jagiellon, King of Poland (d. 1492)
1459 – Mingyi Nyo, founder of Toungoo dynasty of Burma (d. 1530)
1466 – Andrea Doria, Italian admiral (d. 1560)
1485 – Veronica Gambara, Italian poet and stateswoman (d. 1550)
1508 – Andrea Palladio, Italian architect and theoretician, designed the Church of San Giorgio Maggiore and Teatro Olimpico (d. 1580)
1549 – Sir Henry Savile, English scholar and mathematician (d. 1622)
1554 – Philip Sidney, English soldier, courtier, and poet (d. 1586)
1573 – Aubert Miraeus, Belgian historian (d. 1640)
1594 – John Cosin, English bishop and academic (d. 1672)
1599 – Andrea Sacchi, Italian painter (d. 1661)

1601–1900
1614 – William Howard, 1st Viscount Stafford (d. 1680)
1625 – Jean Domat, French scholar and jurist (d. 1696)
1637 – Louis-Sébastien Le Nain de Tillemont, French historian and author (d. 1698)
1642 – Andrea Pozzo, Jesuit Brother, architect and painter (d. 1709)
1645 – Andreas Werckmeister, German organist, composer, and theorist (d. 1706)
1667 – Jonathan Swift, Irish satirist and essayist (d. 1745)
1670 – John Toland, Irish philosopher and author (d. 1722)
1683 – Ludwig Andreas von Khevenhüller, Austrian field marshal (d. 1744)
1699 – King Christian VI of Denmark (d. 1746)
1719 – Princess Augusta of Saxe-Gotha (d. 1772)
1723 – William Livingston, American lawyer and politician, 1st Governor of New Jersey (d. 1790)
1748 – Joachim Albertini, Italian-Polish composer (d. 1838)
1756 – Ernst Chladni, German physicist and author (d. 1827)
1764 – Franz Xaver Gerl, Austrian singer and composer (d. 1827)
1768 – Jędrzej Śniadecki, Polish physician, chemist, and biologist (d. 1838)
1781 – Alexander Berry, Scottish surgeon, merchant, and explorer (d. 1873)
1791 – Count Franz Philipp von Lamberg, Austrian field marshal and politician (d. 1848)
1796 – Carl Loewe, German singer, composer, and conductor (d. 1869)
1810 – Oliver Winchester, American businessman and politician, founded the Winchester Repeating Arms Company (d. 1880)
1813 – Louise-Victorine Ackermann, French poet and author (d. 1890)
  1813   – Charles-Valentin Alkan, French pianist and composer (d. 1888)
1817 – Theodor Mommsen, German jurist, historian, and scholar, Nobel Prize laureate (d. 1903)
1821 – Frederick Temple, English archbishop and academic (d. 1902)
1825 – William-Adolphe Bouguereau, French painter and educator (d. 1905)
1832 – James Dickson, English-Australian politician, 13th Premier of Queensland (d. 1901)
1835 – Mark Twain, American novelist, humorist, and critic (d. 1910)
1836 – Lord Frederick Cavendish, Anglo-Irish soldier and politician, Chief Secretary for Ireland (d. 1882)
1840 – Henry Birks, Canadian businessman, founded Birks & Mayors (d. 1928)
1843 – Martha Ripley, American physician (d. 1912)
1847 – Afonso Pena, Brazilian lawyer and politician, 6th President of Brazil (d. 1909)
1857 – Bobby Abel, English cricketer (d. 1936)
1858 – Jagadish Chandra Bose, Indian physicist, biologist, botanist, and archaeologist (d. 1937)
1863 – Andrés Bonifacio, Filipino activist and politician, co-founded Katipunan (d. 1897) 
1866 – Andrey Lyapchev, Bulgarian politician, Prime Minister of Bulgaria (d. 1933)
1869 – Gustaf Dalén, Swedish physicist and engineer, Nobel Prize laureate (d. 1937) 
  1869   – James Hamilton, 3rd Duke of Abercorn, English lawyer and politician, Governor of Northern Ireland (d. 1953) 
1872 – John McCrae, Canadian physician, soldier, and poet (d. 1918)
1873 – Božena Benešová, Czech author and poet (d. 1936)
1874 – Winston Churchill, English colonel, journalist, and politician, Prime Minister of the United Kingdom, Nobel Prize laureate (d. 1965)
  1874   – Lucy Maud Montgomery, English-Canadian author and poet (d. 1942)
1875 – Myron Grimshaw, American baseball player (d. 1936)
  1875   – Otto Strandman, Estonian lawyer and politician, 2nd Prime Minister of Estonia (d. 1941)
1883 – Gustav Suits, Estonian-Swedish poet and politician (d. 1956)
1887 – Andrej Gosar, Slovenian economist, lawyer, and politician (d. 1970)
  1887   – Beatrice Kerr, Australian swimmer and diver (d. 1971)
1888 – Harry Altham, English cricketer and coach (d. 1965)
1889 – Edgar Adrian, 1st Baron Adrian, English physiologist and academic, Nobel Prize laureate (d. 1977)
  1889   – Reuvein Margolies, Ukrainian-Israeli author and scholar (d. 1971)
1898 – Firpo Marberry, American baseball player and manager (d. 1976)

1901–present
1904 – Clyfford Still, American painter and educator (d. 1980)
1906 – John Dickson Carr, American author and playwright (d. 1977)
  1906   – Andrés Henestrosa, Mexican poet, linguist, and politician (d. 2008)
1907 – Jacques Barzun, French-American historian and author (d. 2012)
1909 – Robert Nighthawk, American singer and guitarist (d. 1967)
1911 – Carle Hessay, German-Canadian painter (d. 1978)
  1911   – Jorge Negrete, Mexican singer and actor (d. 1953)
1912 – Jaan Hargel, Estonian flute player, conductor, and educator (d. 1966)
  1912   – Gordon Parks, American photographer and director (d. 2006)
1915 – Brownie McGhee, American folk-blues singer and guitarist (d. 1996)
  1915   – Henry Taube, Canadian-American chemist and academic, Nobel Prize laureate (d. 2005)
1916 – Dena Epstein, American musicologist and author (d. 2013)
  1916   – Michael Gwynn, English actor (d. 1976)
1918 – Efrem Zimbalist, Jr., American actor (d. 2014)
1919 – Jane C. Wright, American oncologist and cancer researcher (d. 2013)
1920 – Virginia Mayo, American actress (d. 2005)
1924 – Elliott Blackstone, American police officer and activist (d. 2006)
  1924   – Shirley Chisholm, American activist, educator and politician (d. 2005)
  1924   – Allan Sherman, American actor, comedian, singer, producer, and screenwriter (d. 1973)
1925 – Maryon Pittman Allen, American journalist and politician (d. 2018)
  1925   – William H. Gates, Sr., American lawyer and philanthropist (d. 2020)
1926 – Teresa Gisbert Carbonell, Bolivian architect and art historian (d. 2018)
  1926   – Richard Crenna, American actor, director, and producer (d. 2003)
1927 – Robert Guillaume, American actor and singer (d. 2017)
1928 – Takako Doi, Japanese scholar and politician 68th Speaker of the House of Representatives of Japan (d. 2014)
  1928   – Joe B. Hall, American basketball player and coach (d. 2022)
  1928   – Steele Hall, Australian politician, 36th Premier of South Australia
  1928   – Andres Narvasa, Filipino lawyer and jurist, 19th Chief Justice of the Supreme Court of the Philippines (d. 2013) 
1929 – Dick Clark, American television host and producer, founded Dick Clark Productions (d. 2012)
  1929   – Joan Ganz Cooney, American screenwriter and producer, co-created Sesame Street
1930 – G. Gordon Liddy, American lawyer, radio host, television actor and criminal (d. 2021)
1931 – Vivian Lynn, New Zealand artist (d. 2018)
  1931   – Bill Walsh, American football player and coach (d. 2007)
  1931   – Margot Zemach, American author and illustrator (d. 1989)
1932 – Bob Moore, American bassist
  1932   – Cho Nam-chul, South Korean Go player (d. 2006)
1933 – Norman Deeley, English footballer and manager (d. 2007)
  1933   – Sam Gilliam, American painter and educator (d. 2022)
1934 – Marcel Prud'homme, Canadian politician (d. 2017)
1935 – Woody Allen, American actor, director, and screenwriter
1936 – Dmitri Anosov, Russian mathematician and academic (d. 2014)
  1936   – Abbie Hoffman, American activist and author, co-founded the Youth International Party (d. 1989)
1937 – Jimmy Bowen, American record producer, songwriter, and pop singer
  1937   – Praveen Chaudhari, Indian-American physicist and academic (d. 2010)
  1937   – Frank Ifield, English-Australian singer and guitarist
  1937   – Luther Ingram, American R&B/soul singer-songwriter (d. 2007)
  1937   – Ridley Scott, English director, producer, and production designer
  1937   – Tom Simpson, English cyclist (d. 1967)
  1937   – Adeline Yen Mah, Chinese-American physician and author
1938 – Jean Eustache, French director, producer, and screenwriter (d. 1981)
  1938   – John M. Goldman, English haematologist and oncologist (d. 2013)
1938 – Hani al-Rahib,  Syrian novelist and literary academic. (d. 2000) 
1940 – Kevin Phillips, American journalist and author
  1940   – Dan Tieman, American basketball player and coach (d. 2012)
1941 – Phil Willis, Baron Willis of Knaresborough, English politician
1943 – Norma Alarcón, American author and professor
  1943   – Terrence Malick, American director, producer, and screenwriter
  1943   – Sokratis Kosmidis, Greek lawyer and politician
1944 – George Graham, Scottish footballer and manager 
1945 – Hilary Armstrong, Baroness Armstrong of Hill Top, English academic and politician, Chancellor of the Duchy of Lancaster
  1945   – Roger Glover, Welsh bass player, songwriter, and producer
  1945   – Vani Jairam, Indian playback singer (d. 2023)
  1945   – John R. Powers, American author and playwright (d. 2013)
1946 – George Duffield, English jockey and trainer
1947 – Sergio Badilla Castillo, Chilean-Swedish poet and translator
  1947   – David Mamet, American playwright, screenwriter, and director
1949 – Jimmy London, Jamaican singer-songwriter
  1949   – Matthew Festing, 79th Prince and Grand Master of the Sovereign Military Order of Malta
1950 – Patricia Ann Tracey, American Naval Vice Admiral
  1950   – Paul Westphal, American basketball player and coach (d. 2021)
1951 – Daniel Petrie, Jr., American director, producer, and screenwriter
1952 – Semyon Bychkov, Russian-American conductor
  1952   – Mandy Patinkin, American actor and singer
1953 – Shuggie Otis, American singer-songwriter and musician 
  1953   – June Pointer, American singer and actress (d. 2006)
  1953   – David Sancious, American rock and jazz keyboard player and guitarist
1954 – Wayne Bartholomew, Australian surfer
  1954   – Lawrence Summers, American economist and academic
1955 – Michael Beschloss, American historian and author
  1955   – Richard Burr, American businessman, academic, and politician
  1955   – Kevin Conroy, American actor (d. 2022)
  1955   – Andy Gray, Scottish footballer and sportscaster
  1955   – Billy Idol, English singer-songwriter, guitarist, and actor
1957 – John Ashton, English guitarist, songwriter, and producer 
  1957   – Richard Barbieri, English keyboard player and songwriter
  1957   – Joël Champetier, Canadian author and screenwriter (d. 2015)
  1957   – Thomas McElwee Irish Republican, died on hunger strike (d. 1981)
  1957   – Patrick McLoughlin, English miner and politician, Secretary of State for Transport
  1957   – Colin Mochrie, Scottish-Canadian comedian, actor, producer, and screenwriter
  1957   – Margaret Spellings, American educator and politician, 8th United States Secretary of Education
1958 – Stacey Q, American pop singer-songwriter, dancer and actress
1959 – Cherie Currie, American singer-songwriter, musician, and actress 
  1959   – George Faber, British television producer
  1959   – Lorraine Kelly, Scottish journalist and actress
  1959   – Hugo Swire, English soldier and politician, Minister of State for Foreign Affairs
1960 – Bill Halter, American scholar, activist, and politician, 14th Lieutenant Governor of Arkansas
  1960   – Rich Fields, American radio personality and announcer
  1960   – Gary Lineker, English footballer and sportscaster
  1960   – Michael O'Connor, Australian rugby player
  1960   – Bob Tewksbury, American baseball player and coach
1961 – Innocent Egbunike, Nigerian sprinter and coach
  1961   – Ian Morris, Trinidadian footballer and sprinter
1962 – Jimmy Del Ray, American wrestler and manager (d. 2014)
  1962   – Bo Jackson, American football and baseball player
  1962   – Daniel Keys Moran, American computer programmer and author
1964 – Jushin Thunder Liger, Japanese wrestler and mixed martial artist
1965 – Aldair, Brazilian footballer
  1965   – Fumihito, Prince Akishino, Japanese royal (younger brother of Emperor Naruhito and first in line to the Chrysanthemum throne)
  1965   – David Laws, English banker and politician, Chief Secretary to the Treasury
  1965   – Ben Stiller, American actor, director, producer and screenwriter
1966 – Nigel Adams, English businessman and politician
  1966   – David Berkoff, American swimmer
  1966   – David Nicholls, English author and screenwriter
  1966   – Mika Salo, Finnish racing driver
  1966   – John Bishop, English comedian  presenter and actor
1967 – Joseph Corré, English fashion designer and businessman, co-founded Agent Provocateur
  1967   – Rajiv Dixit, Indian author and activist (d. 2010)
  1967   – Richard Harry, Australian rugby player
1968 – Des'ree, English R&B singer-songwriter
  1968   – Laurent Jalabert, French cyclist and sportscaster
1969 – Marc Forster, German-Swiss director, producer, and screenwriter
  1969   – Marc Goossens, Belgian racing driver
  1969   – Chris Weitz, American actor, director, producer, and screenwriter
1970 – Phil Babb, English footballer and manager
  1970   – Walter Emanuel Jones, American actor and dancer
1971 – Ray Durham, American baseball player
1972 – Christophe Beck, Canadian television and film score composer and conductor
  1972   – Dan Jarvis, English soldier and politician
  1972   – Stanislav Kitto, Estonian footballer
  1972   – Abel Xavier, Portuguese footballer and manager
1973 – Christian Cage, Canadian wrestler, actor, and podcaster 
1975 – Mindy McCready, American singer-songwriter (d. 2013)
  1975   – Ben Thatcher, English footballer
1976 – Marta Burgay, Italian astronomer
  1976   – Marco Castro, Peruvian-American director and cinematographer
  1976   – Josh Lewsey, English rugby player
  1976   – Paul Nuttall, British politician
  1976   – Andres Lacson, Filipino politician
1977 – Richard Elias Anderson, Canadian basketball player and coach
  1977   – Steve Aoki, American DJ and producer, founded Dim Mak Records
  1977   – Iván Guerrero, Honduran footballer and manager
  1977   – Kazumi Saito, Japanese baseball player and coach
  1977   – Olivier Schoenfelder, French ice dancer and coach
1978 – Clay Aiken, American singer 
  1978   – Benjamin Lense, German footballer
1979 – Chris Atkinson, Australian racing driver
  1979   – Andrés Nocioni, Argentinian basketball player
1980 – Cem Adrian, Turkish singer-songwriter, producer, and director
  1980   – Jamie Ashdown, English footballer
1981 – Rich Harden, Canadian baseball player
1982 – Elisha Cuthbert, Canadian actress
  1982   – Tony Giarratano, American baseball player
  1982   – Jason Pominville, Canadian ice hockey player
1983 – Adrian Cristea, Romanian footballer
  1983   – Vladislav Polyakov, Kazakhstani swimmer
1984 – Nigel de Jong, Dutch footballer
  1984   – Alan Hutton, Scottish footballer
  1984   – Olga Rypakova, Kazakhstani triple jumper
  1984   – Francisco Sandaza, Spanish footballer
1985 – Kaley Cuoco, American actress
  1985   – Hikari Mitsushima, Japanese actress and singer
  1985   – Chrissy Teigen, American model
1986 – Jordan Farmar, American basketball player 
  1986   – Evgenia Linetskaya, Israeli tennis player
1987 – Vasilisa Bardina, Russian tennis player
  1987   – Naomi Knight, American wrestler, model, and dancer 
  1987   – Dougie Poynter, English singer-songwriter and bass player 
1988 – Phillip Hughes, Australian cricketer (d. 2014)
  1988   – Vitaliy Polyanskyi, Ukrainian footballer
  1988   – Tomi Saarelma, Finnish footballer
1989 – Vladimír Weiss, Slovak footballer
1990 – Magnus Carlsen, Norwegian chess player
  1990   – Antoine N'Gossan, Ivorian footballer
1991 – Agnatius Paasi, Tongan rugby league player
1994 – Sofia Araújo, Portuguese tennis player

Deaths

Pre-1600
1016 – Edmund Ironside, English king (b. 993)
1204 – Emeric, King of Hungary
1276 – Kanezawa Sanetoki, Japanese member of the Hōjō clan (b. 1224)
1283 – John of Vercelli, Master General of the Dominican Order (b. c. 1205)
1378 – Andrew Stratford, English verderer and landowner
1525 – Guillaume Crétin, French poet (b. c. 1460)
1526 – Giovanni dalle Bande Nere, Italian captain (b. 1498)
1580 – Richard Farrant, English playwright and composer (b. 1530)
1600 – Nanda Bayin, Burmese king (b. 1535)

1601–1900
1603 – William Gilbert, English scientist (b. 1544)
1623 – Thomas Weelkes, English organist and composer (b. 1576)
1647 – Bonaventura Cavalieri, Italian mathematician and astronomer (b. 1598)
  1647   – Giovanni Lanfranco, Italian painter (b. 1582)
1654 – John Selden, English jurist and scholar (b. 1584)
1675 – Cecil Calvert, 2nd Baron Baltimore, English lawyer and politician, Lieutenant Governor of Newfoundland (b. 1605)
1694 – Marcello Malpighi, Italian physician and biologist (b. 1628)
1703 – Nicolas de Grigny, French organist and composer (b. 1672)
1718 – Charles XII of Sweden (b. 1682)
1760 – Friederike Caroline Neuber, German actress (b. 1697)
1761 – John Dollond, English optician and astronomer (b. 1706)
1765 – George Glas, Scottish merchant and explorer (b. 1725)
1863 – Kamehameha IV, Hawaiian King (b. 1834)
1864 – Patrick Cleburne, Irish-American general (b. 1828)
1892 – Dimitrios Valvis, Greek judge and politician, 69th Prime Minister of Greece (b. 1814)
1900 – Oscar Wilde, Irish playwright, novelist, and poet (b. 1854)

1901–present
1901 – Edward John Eyre, English explorer and politician, Governor of Jamaica (b. 1815)
1907 – Ludwig Levy, German architect (b. 1854)
1908 – Nishinoumi Kajirō I, Japanese sumo wrestler, the 16th Yokozuna (b. 1855)
1920 – Vladimir May-Mayevsky, Russian general (b. 1867)
1923 – John Maclean, Scottish educator and revolutionary socialist activist (b. 1879)
1930 – Ponnambalam Ramanathan, Sri Lankan lawyer and politician, 3rd Solicitor General of Sri Lanka (b. 1851)
  1930   – Mary Harris Jones, American Labor organizer (b. 1837)
1931 – Henry Walters, American art collector and philanthropist (b. 1848)
1933 – Arthur Currie, Canadian general (b. 1875)
1934 – Hélène Boucher, French pilot (b. 1908)
1935 – Fernando Pessoa, Portuguese poet, philosopher, and critic (b. 1888)
1942 – Anthony M. Rud, American journalist and author (b. 1893)
1943 – Etty Hillesum, Dutch author (b. 1914)
1944 – Paul Masson, French cyclist (b. 1876)
1949 – Frank Cooper, Australian politician, 25th Premier of Queensland (b. 1872)
1953 – Francis Picabia, French painter and poet (b. 1879)
1954 – Wilhelm Furtwängler, German conductor and composer (b. 1886)
1955 – Josip Štolcer-Slavenski, Croatian composer and educator (b. 1896)
1958 – Hubert Wilkins, Australian pilot, ornithologist, geographer, and explorer (b. 1888)
1966 – Salah Suheimat, Jordanian lawyer and politician (b. 1914)
1967 – Patrick Kavanagh, Irish poet and author (b. 1904)
1972 – Compton Mackenzie, English-Scottish actor, author, and academic (b. 1883)
1977 – Terence Rattigan, English playwright and screenwriter (b. 1911)
1979 – Laura Gilpin, American photographer (b.1891)
  1979   – Zeppo Marx, American actor and comedian (b. 1901)
1987 – Simon Carmiggelt, Dutch journalist and author (b. 1913)
1988 – Pannonica de Koenigswarter, English-American singer-songwriter (b. 1913)
1989 – Ahmadou Ahidjo, Cameroonian lawyer and politician, 1st President of Cameroon (b. 1924)
  1989   – Alfred Herrhausen, German banker (b. 1930)
1990 – Fritz Eichenberg, German-American illustrator and arts educator (b. 1901)
1992 – Peter Blume, American painter and sculptor (b. 1906)
1993 – David Houston, American singer-songwriter (b. 1938)
1994 – Guy Debord, French theorist and author (b. 1931)
  1994   – Lionel Stander, American actor (b. 1908)
1996 – Tiny Tim, American singer and ukulele player (b. 1932)
1997 – Kathy Acker, American author, poet, and playwright (b. 1947)
1998 – Janet Lewis, American novelist and poet (b. 1899)
  1998   – Margaret Walker, American author and poet (b. 1915)
2000 – Eloise Jarvis McGraw, American author (b. 1915)
  2000   – Scott Smith, Canadian bass player (b. 1955)
2003 – Gertrude Ederle, American swimmer (b. 1905)
2004 – Pierre Berton, Canadian journalist and author (b. 1920)
  2004   – Seungsahn, South Korean spiritual leader, founded the Kwan Um School of Zen (b. 1927)
2005 – Jean Parker, American actress (b. 1915)
2006 – Elhadi Adam, Sudanese poet and songwriter (b. 1927)
  2006   – Rafael Buenaventura, Filipino banker (b. 1938)
  2006   – Shirley Walker, American composer and conductor (b. 1945)
2007 – Engin Arık, Turkish physicist and academic (b. 1948)
  2007   – Evel Knievel, American motorcycle rider and stuntman (b. 1938)
2008 – Munetaka Higuchi, Japanese drummer and producer (b. 1958)
2010 – Rajiv Dixit, Indian author and activist (b. 1967)
  2010   – Garry Gross, American photographer (b. 1937)
2012 – Rogelio Álvarez, Cuban-American baseball player (b. 1938)
  2012   – I. K. Gujral, Indian lawyer and politician, 12th Prime Minister of India (b. 1919)
  2012   – Munir Malik, Pakistani cricketer (b. 1931)
  2012   – Susil Moonesinghe, Sri Lankan lawyer and politician, 4th Chief Minister of Western Province (b. 1930)
  2012   – Merv Pregulman, American football player and businessman (b. 1922)
  2012   – Homer R. Warner, American cardiologist and academic (b. 1922)
  2012   – Mitchell Cole, English footballer (b. 1985)
2013 – Paul Crouch, American broadcaster, co-founded Trinity Broadcasting Network (b. 1934)
  2013   – Jean Kent, English actress (b. 1921)
  2013   – Tabu Ley Rochereau, Congolese-Belgian singer-songwriter (b. 1937)
  2013   – Doriano Romboni, Italian motorcycle racer (b. 1968)
  2013   – Paul Walker, American actor (b. 1973)
2014 – Qayyum Chowdhury, Bangladeshi painter and academic (b. 1932)
  2014   – Jarbom Gamlin, Indian lawyer and politician, 7th Chief Minister of Arunachal Pradesh (b. 1961)
  2014   – Martin Litton, American rafter and environmentalist (b. 1917)
  2014   – Anthony Dryden Marshall, American CIA officer and diplomat (b. 1924)
  2014   – Go Seigen, Chinese-Japanese Go player (b. 1914)
  2014   – Kent Haruf, American novelist (b. 1943)
2015 – Pío Caro Baroja, Spanish director and screenwriter (b. 1928)
  2015   – Minas Hatzisavvas, Greek actor and screenwriter (b. 1948)
  2015   – Marcus Klingberg, Polish-Israeli physician and biologist (b. 1918)
  2015   – Fatema Mernissi, Moroccan sociologist and author (b. 1940)
  2015   – Shigeru Mizuki, Japanese author and illustrator (b. 1922)
  2015   – Eldar Ryazanov, Russian director and screenwriter (b. 1927)
  2015   – Nigel Buxton, British travel writer and wine critic (b. 1924)
2017 – Jim Nabors, American actor and comedian (b. 1930)
  2017   – Surin Pitsuwan, Thai politician and diplomat (b. 1949)
  2017   – Marina Popovich, Soviet pilot, engineer and military officer (b. 1931)
  2017   – Alfie Curtis, British actor (b. 1930)
2018 – George H. W. Bush, American politician, 41st President of the United States (b. 1924)
2020 – Irina Antonova, Russian art historian (b. 1922)
2022 – Jiang Zemin, Chinese politician, former General Secretary of the Chinese Communist Party (paramount leader) and President of China (b. 1926)
  2022   – Christine McVie, English singer-songwriter and keyboard player (b. 1943)

Holidays and observances
 Bonifacio Day (Philippines)
 Christian feast day:
 Andrew and its related observances.
 Joseph Marchand (one of Vietnamese Martyrs)
 November 30 (Eastern Orthodox liturgics)
 Commemoration Day (United Arab Emirates) 
Day to Mark the Departure and Expulsion of Jews from the Arab Countries and Iran (Israel)
 Independence Day, celebrates the independence of Barbados from the United Kingdom in 1966
 National Day (Benin)
 Regina Mundi Day (South Africa)
 Saint Andrew's Day (Scotland)

References

External links

 
 
 

Days of the year
November